John Herkimer (1773 Tryon County, New York – June 8, 1848 Danube, Herkimer County, New York) was an American lawyer and politician from New York.

Life
Herkimer was the son of George Herkimer (brother of Gen. Nicholas Herkimer and Johan Jost Herkimer).

He was a member from Montgomery County of the New York State Assembly in 1800, 1804 and 1806. He was a delegate to the New York State Constitutional Convention of 1801.

During the War of 1812, he served in the State Militia as a Major, leading a battalion in the defense of Sackets Harbor, New York.

In 1817, the Town of Danube (in which area Herkimer's home was located) was created from a part of the Town of Minden, and the area transferred from Montgomery to Herkimer County. Afterwards Herkimer was an associate judge of the Herkimer County Court for some years.

Herkimer was elected as a Democratic-Republican to the 15th and the 18th United States Congresses, holding office from March 4, 1817, to March 3, 1819; and from March 4, 1823, to March 3, 1825.

He was buried at the General Herkimer Cemetery in Danube.

External links

A History of Herkimer County by Nathaniel S. Benton (Herkimer family: pages 149ff; John Herkimer: pages 170)
The New York Civil List compiled by Franklin Benjamin Hough (pages 71, 173, 177, 179, 280; Weed, Parsons and Co., 1858)

1773 births
1848 deaths
New York (state) state court judges
People from Herkimer County, New York
Members of the New York State Assembly
People from Montgomery County, New York
American people of German descent
Democratic-Republican Party members of the United States House of Representatives from New York (state)
People from New York (state) in the War of 1812